Natasha Lloyd (born 23 December 1995) is a New Zealand swimmer. 

Lloyd received her secondary education at St. Andrew's College in Christchurch. In 2013, she broke the long-standing women's aged 17 100 m breaststroke record that had been set by Anna Wilson in 1995.

Lloyd competed in the women's 100 metre breaststroke event at the 2017 World Aquatics Championships.

References

1995 births
Living people
New Zealand female swimmers
Place of birth missing (living people)
People educated at St Andrew's College, Christchurch
Swimmers from Christchurch
Female breaststroke swimmers
20th-century New Zealand women
21st-century New Zealand women